Gianpaolo Bissi (2 May 1941 – 24 June 2022) was an Italian politician. A member of the Italian Democratic Socialist Party, he served in the Senate of the Republic from 1987 to 1992.

Bissi died in Teglio on 23 June 2022 at the age of 81.

References

1941 births
2022 deaths
Italian politicians
Italian Socialist Party politicians
Italian Democratic Socialist Party politicians
Senators of Legislature X of Italy
People from the Province of Sondrio